Anthony Martin, better known by his stage name Awol One, is an alternative hip hop artist and graphic designer based in Los Angeles, California.

Discography

Albums
Awol One
 Souldoubt (2001) (with Daddy Kev)
 Number 3 on the Phone (2002) (with Daddy Kev)
 Speakerface (2002) (with Mike Nardone)
 Slanguage (2003) (with Daddy Kev)
 Self Titled (2004)
 The War of Art (2006)
 Only Death Can Kill You (2007) (with Factor)
 Owl Hours (2009) (with Factor)
 The Landmark (2011) (with Factor)
 The Child Star (2011) (with Nathaniel Motte)
 The Mombie (2013)
 Feo (2016)
Primer (2019)

The Shape Shifters (Awol One with Akuma, Circus, Die Young, DJ Rob One, Existereo, LA Jae, Life Rexall & Radioinactive)
 Planet of the Shapes (1998)
 Adopted by Aliens (2000)
 Know Future (2000)
 The Shape Shifters Was Here (2004)

Three Eyed Cowz (Awol One with Digit 6, DJ ESP, Gel Roc, Origin, Regret, Syndrome 228 & Vyrus)
 The Evil Cow Burger (1998)
 Four Eyed Mortalz (2000)

The Chemikillz (Awol One with Mascaria)
 The Chemikillz (2006)
 Eggs of Blood (2009)

Other collaborations

 Awol One & Ecid Are... (2010) (with Ecid)
 The Cloaks (2010) (with Gel Roc, as The Cloaks)

EPs
 Propaganda (2002) (with Fat Jack)
 Splitsville (2007) (split with DJ Moves & Josh Martinez)
 Shockra! (2012)
 Self Induced (2013)
 Crossroads EP (2015) (with Factor)

Guest appearances
 Busdriver & Radioinactive with Daedelus - "Barely Music" from The Weather (2003)
 2Mex - "No Category" from Sweat Lodge Infinite (2003)
 Abstract Rude & Tribe Unique - "Flow and Tell" from Showtyme (2003)
 Existereo - "Space Meditation" from Dirty Deeds & Dead Flowers (2003)
 Josh Martinez - "Women Loving Women" from Buck Up Princess (2004)
 Busdriver - "Cosmic Cleavage" from Cosmic Cleavage (2004)
 Circus vs. Andre Afram Asmar - "Nobody Special" from Gawd Bless the Faceless Cowards (2004)
 2Mex - "Baby I Ain't Joking" from 2Mex (2004)
 Abstract Rude - "Waiting For My Ruca" from Look at All the Love We Found (2005)
 Daddy Kev - "Lick Me I'm Famous" from Lost Angels (2005)
 Subtitle - "Crew Cut (for Sale) from Young Dangerous Heart (2005)
 Blue Sky Black Death - "Everything" from A Heap of Broken Images (2006)
 Scuba Chicken - "Dave The Squirrel" from Lets Play Doctor (2006) 
 LA Symphony - "Love for the Art" from Unleashed (2007)
 Josh Martinez - "Struts" from The World Famous Sex Buffet (2008)
 Factor - "More Rude Than Handsome" from Chandelier (2008)
 Depth Affect - "Dusty Records" from Hero Crisis (2008)
 Speak Easy - "Speak Easy" from Speak Easy (2009)
 Grayskul & Maker - "Revenge of the Alleybastards" from Graymaker (2009)
 Myka 9 - "91 Octane" from 1969 (2009)
 Ceschi - "Same Old Love Song" (2009)
 Factor - "Don't Jock the Dead" from 13 Stories (2010)
 Existereo - "First Time Once Again" from Excuse My French (2010)
 Dark Time Sunshine - "Murder Scene" from Cornucopia (2010)
 Noah23 - "Murder City" from Fry Cook on Venus (2011)
 Factor - "What You Need" from Club Soda Series 1 (2011)
 Brzowski - "Covenant" from A Fitful Sleep (2011)
 Sixo - "Melting Away" from Tracking Perception (2012)
 Sixo - "Gorgeous" from Free Floating Rationales (2012)
 Cadalack Ron + Briefcase - "Jackknife" from Times Is Hard (2012)
 Kay the Aquanaut & Factor - "Pangean Drift" from Letters from Laika (2013)
 Gregory Pepper & Madadam - "Walrus for Mayor" from Big Huge Truck (2013)

References

External links
 
 Awol One at Fake Four Inc.
 Awol One on Facebook
 

Underground rappers
Living people
Rappers from Los Angeles
21st-century American rappers
Year of birth missing (living people)